Metadromius is a genus of beetles in the family Carabidae, containing the following species:

 Metadromius anamurensis Jedlicka, 1965 
 Metadromius arabicus Mateu, 1979 
 Metadromius brittoni Basilewsky, 1948 
 Metadromius carmelitanus Mateu, 1982 
 Metadromius ephippiatus Fairmaire, 1884 
 Metadromius ephippiger Andrewes, 1932 
 Metadromius lateplagiatus Fairmaire, 1873 
 Metadromius myrmidon Fairmaire, 1859  
 Metadromius nanus A. Fiori, 1914 
 Metadromius palmi Machado, 1992 
 Metadromius pervenustus Wollaston, 1864 
 Metadromius ramburii (Piochard De La Brulerie, 1868) 
 Metadromius signifer (Reitter, 1884)

References

Lebiinae